Adam Michael Becker (born 1984) is an American astrophysicist, author, and scientific philosopher. His works include the book What Is Real?, published by Basic Books, which explores the history and personalities surrounding the development and evolution of quantum physics, and includes a modern assessment of the Copenhagen Interpretation.

Academic background 
In 2006, Becker received a Bachelor of Arts (B.A.) degree in Philosophy and Physics from Cornell University only to earn a Master of Science degree in Physics from the University of Michigan a year later. In 2012, Becker would go on to receive a Doctor of Philosophy (Ph.D.) degree in Computational Cosmology from the University of Michigan with the physicist Dragan Huterer as his doctoral advisor. His doctoral thesis concerned primordial non-Gaussianity, which he would later summarize in lay terms for his readers, declaring "I was trying to find out how much we can learn about the way stuff was arranged in the early universe by looking at the way stuff is arranged in the universe right now."

Career 
After completing his doctoral program, Becker wrote and lectured on scientific concepts, providing lay-friendly professional commentary on science.

Becker has written for several news and periodicals concerning science for the interested layperson, including the BBC (which culminated in a video series), NPR, New Scientist Magazine , Scientific American, the New York Times, Aeon, and the global educational program NOVA on the American PBS.

In 2014, while employed at the Public Library of Science, Becker was a lead developer in a project that produced Rich Citations, which were an extensive expansion to the capabilities of digital cross-referencing across the PLOS platform.. Later, around the publishing of his first book, "What is Real?", Becker was appointed as a visiting scholar at the Office for History of Science and Technology at the University of California, Berkeley. In 2020 he accepted a position as a visiting researcher in the Department of Logic and Philosophy of Science, at University of California, Irvine.

Becker has also been a member of the California Quantum Interpretation Network, "a research collaboration among faculty and staff at multiple UC campuses and other universities across California, focusing on the interpretation of quantum physics."

Becker has announced ongoing work on a new publication that takes a step away from the controversy of his first book and instead explores the relationship between science and the Consumer Tech Industry that has evolved and been promulgated across the world from the Silicon Valley of California. This new project has an estimated publication date of "late 2023".

Publication of What is Real? 
In 2016, Becker received a grant from the Alfred P. Sloan Foundation to research and publish a written work concerning the history, development, and controversy surrounding the study and development of the mysticized field of Quantum Foundations. The resulting work, What is Real? (2018), focused on the question of what exactly quantum physics says about the nature of reality.

The book deals with the personalities behind the competing interpretations of quantum physics as well as the historical factors that influenced the debate—factors such as military spending on physics research due to World War II, the Cold War ethos that caused the eschewing of physicists thought to be Marxist, the assumed infallibility of John von Neumann, the sexism that quashed the work of Grete Hermann (the female mathematician who first spotted von Neumann's error), and the sway of prominent philosophical schools of the period, like the logical positivists of the Vienna Circle. Niels Bohr appears in the book as the charismatic figure whose stature and obtuse writing style made it hard for alternate interpretations to be voiced. The book also challenges the popular portrayal of Albert Einstein as a behind-the-times thinker who couldn't accept the new paradigm. Becker argues that Einstein's thought experiments aimed at quantum dynamics are not stodgy quibbles with the seeming randomness of quantum physics, as characterized by the popularity of the quote that "God does not play dice".  Rather, Einstein's thought experiments are apt critiques of violations of the principle of locality.

Reception
"What is Real?" was given mostly positive reviews by lay and expert audiences alike in literary and pop-science panels, such as the New York Times, Publishers Weekly, the Wall Street Journal, and New Scientist, among others,.

In the trade magazine Physics Today, philosopher David Wallace called the book "a superb contribution both to popular understanding of quantum theory and to ongoing debates among experts." And in the journal Nature, Ramin Skibba said "What Is Real? is an argument for keeping an open mind. Becker reminds us that we need humility as we investigate the myriad interpretations and narratives that explain the same data."

Physicist Sheldon Glashow wrote a critical review, saying, "I found it distasteful to find a trained astrophysicist invoking a conspiracy by physicists and physics teachers to foist the Copenhagen interpretation upon naive students of quantum mechanics". A review in the journal Science declared the project to be the sporadically accurate presentation of an "oversimplified" summary of either imaginary or merely ostensible conflicts between very complex schools of thought. Reviews in Science News and the American Journal of Physics were also negative, similarly criticizing the book for numerous historical inaccuracies and philosophical oversimplifications. 

The book was nominated for the PEN/E. O. Wilson Literary Science Writing Award and Physics World Magazine's Book of the Year Award.

Selected publications 
Books

Articles and websites

 
  (BBC animated video series)
 
 
 Scientific American: https://blogs.scientificamerican.com/observations/the-difficult-birth-of-the-many-worlds-interpretation-of-quantum-mechanics/
 New Scientist: https://www.newscientist.com/article/mg21929274-200-wormhole-entanglement-gives-space-time-the-bends/
 NOVA: https://www.pbs.org/wgbh/nova/article/quantum-gambling-and-the-nature-of-reality/
 Interactive Description of Bell's Theorem: https://freelanceastro.github.io/bell/
 Aeon: https://aeon.co/essays/a-fetish-for-falsification-and-observation-holds-back-science
 Undark: https://undark.org/article/junk-science-or-real-thing-inference/

References 

1984 births
Living people
21st-century American physicists
American astrophysicists
Cornell University alumni
Science communicators
University of Michigan College of Literature, Science, and the Arts alumni
21st-century American non-fiction writers